Burkina Faso is a multilingual country. An estimated 70 languages are spoken there, of which about 66 are indigenous. The Mossi language is spoken by about 52.5% of the population, mainly in the central region around the capital, Ouagadougou. French is the official language. English is very rarely spoken.

In the west, Mande languages are widely spoken, the most predominant being Dyula (also spelled Jula or Dioula), others including Bobo, Samo, and Marka. The Fula language is widespread, particularly in the north. The Gourmanché language is spoken in the east, while the Bissa language is spoken in the south.

Education for the deaf in Burkina uses American Sign Language, which was introduced by the deaf American missionary Andrew Foster. The Burkina Sign Language is used in Ouagadougou.

French language
The official language is French, which was introduced when France colonized Burkina Faso in 1919. French is the principal language of administrative, political and judicial institutions, public services, and the press. It is the only language for laws, administration and courts. French is the language of instruction in the nation's schools. However, fewer than 15 percent of the population uses French on a day-to-day basis. Despite this low percentage, there is a high amount of support in keeping French as the language of instruction because it provides children a pathway to social mobility and assures continued economic support for education. In fact, according to a 1998 report, “Burkinabe saw no interest in sending their children to school to learn a language that they already spoke at home”.

French is one of 13 languages used on the radio.

National languages
The Mossi language, also known as Mòoré, is the most widely spoken language in the country, with 48 percent of Burkinabe being speakers as of 2008. Dyula and Fulfulde are also recognized as national languages. This has caused consternation with speakers of the other languages, who have protested it as an injustice.

The country's name was taken from words in two of the most widely spoken languages, with ‘Burkina’ meaning ‘man of integrity’ in Mossi and ‘Faso’ meaning ‘father’s house’ in Dyula.

Fulfulde is the lingua franca in many parts of Burkina Faso. It is widely spoken in the north and east of the country as a first language, with 8.36 percent of the population able to speak it. Dyula is also a lingua franca and is widely used as a trading language. A 2014 survey reported that 5.7% of the population speaks Dyula as their dominant language at home, but the number of L2 speakers is likely much higher.

Most of the languages that are spoken belong to either the Mande or Gur branches. In rural areas of Burkina Faso, one's native language is typically used for common activities. In large towns, most people are multilingual. Although not recognized as a national language, Gourmanché is spoken by 5.51% of the population. Other important minority languages include Bissa, spoken by 2.85%; Bwamu, spoken by 1.91%, Dagara, spoken by 1.76%; and Samo, spoken by 1.66%. Dagara is spoken in the southwestern part of Burkina Faso and borrows heavily from French and, to a lesser degree, English.

Endangered languages include:

 Jalkunan [aka Dyala, Dyalanu, Jalkuna]
 Kalamsé [aka Kalemsé, Kalenga, Sàmòmá]
 Khe [aka Kheso, Bambadion-Kheso,]
 Khisa [aka Komono, Khi Khipa, Kumwenu]
 Natioro [aka Koo'ra, Natyoro, Natjoro]
 Pana (Burkina Faso) [aka Sama,]
 Pongu [aka Pongo, Pangu, Arringeu]
 Sininkere [aka Silinkere, Silanke,]
 Tiéfo [aka Foro, Tyefo, Tyeforo]
 Wara [aka Wára, Ouara, Ouala]

See also
African French
Education in Burkina Faso

References

External links
Ethnologue listing of Burkina Faso languages